Sufetula minuscula is a moth in the family Crambidae. It is found in Japan (Ogasawara Islands).

References

Moths described in 1996
Spilomelinae